Ponmalai Nathar Temple, also known as Kanagagireeswar temple in Devikapuram is at a height of about 500 feet, from the mean sea level. It is thought to have been built approximately 1000 years ago during the reign of the Chola King. Later the temple was expanded during the Vijayanagara Period in the 15th century.

A story says that while a villager named Irula was digging the forest and collecting roots, his axe hit a Lingam underneath. As a result of this sinful act, he fell unconscious. On account of his deep devotion to the Lord, the God appeared in his dream and told him that he is present inside the pit. At once, he found the Lingam, installed it on the top of the hillock and worshiped it. Subsequently, when a Pallava king, who was marching with his army through this place, learned of this Deity, he worshiped it and vowed to build a grand temple at this place, if he returned victorious.

Description

Several steps lead to the top of the hill. First is the Veerabadrar's shrine. Sri Aladi Viniayagar is installed mid-way to the flight of steps leading to uphill. On a rock, to the north of the hill top, are two footprints of the Ambal. It is believed to be those of the Ambal, who performed a severe penance for Sri Ponmalainathar, in a standing posture. Just in front of the temple there is a thirty-six pillared mandapam bearing several beautiful sculptures in its pillars.

The temple is 140 feet long and 70 feet wide. The famous "Navanarikunjaram" sculpture is found in the inner prakaram. In the southern prakaram of the temple are found the Sannidhis of Sri Visalakshiamman, Sptah Kanniars and Sri Dhakshnamoorthy, while the Sannadhis of Sri Vinayagar and Sri Murugar are located in the western prakaram.

Two lingam are installed in the sanctum sanctorum. The Lingam at the rear is Sri Kanakagiriswarar alias Ponmalainathar, which is a 2 ft-high Swayambu Lingam. The first dharsan in this temple is that of Sri Viswanadhar. The notable features of the temple are, unlike other shrines, abishegam is done to the deity here with hot water only instead of cold water.

Saint Arunagirinathar appears to have visited this shrine and sung songs in praise of the deity, through his famous "Thiruppugazh" in which he described this sthalam as Kanakagiri.

Sri Thiukameswarar
A small temple is found at the bottom of the hill to the north. People call the deity there Sri Thiukameswarar, also known as Sri Kanaswarar. Sri Kokilambal is his consort. Her sannidhi is to the northwest. The temple of Sri Thirukaneswarar is 20 feet long and 11 feet wide. It is designed with nine granite stones. Two lingams are installed in the sanctum sanctorum. The Lingam at the rear is Sri Kanakagiriswarar alias Ponmalainathar, who is a 2 feet high Swaymbu Lingam. The first dharsan in this temple is that of Sri Viswanathar. Abishegam is done to the deity here with hot water only. Images of pigs are found on the outer walls of the temple. The images of the pigs might have been intended to create sentimental feelings among Muslim invaders and prevent them from destroying the temple.

Saint Arunagirinathar appears to have visited this shrine and sung songs in praise of the deity, through his famous "Thiruppugazh", in which he has described this sthalam as Kanakagiri.

Hindu temples in Tiruvannamalai district